Lophocampa niveigutta is a moth of the family Erebidae. It was described by Francis Walker in 1856. It is found in Brazil and Colombia.

Description

References

 
Halysidota niveigutta at BHL

niveigutta
Moths described in 1856